Kumeleh District is a district (bakhsh) in Langarud County, Gilan Province, Iran. At the 2006 census, its population was 27,394, in 8,034 families.  The District has two cities: Kumeleh and Shalman. The District has two rural districts (dehestan): Daryasar Rural District and Moridan Rural District.

References 

Langarud County
Districts of Gilan Province